The Sophia River, part of the Pieman River catchment, is a perennial river located in the West Coast region of Tasmania, Australia.

Course and features
The Sophie River rises below Sophie Peak, part of the West Coast Range within the Granite Tor Conservation Area. The river flows generally west by north and reaches its confluence with the Mackintosh River within Lake Mackintosh. The river descends  over its  course.

Lake Mackintosh and several adjoining reservoirs form part of the Pieman River Power Development scheme and some of the flow of the Sophie River supplies the Mackintosh Power Station for the generation of hydroelectricity. The Sophia Tunnel feeder from Murchison Dam has its outlet near Sophia River. The Sophia Adit, a small tunnel for maintaining the Sophia Tunnel, is located adjacent to the river.

References

Rivers of Tasmania
West Coast Range